Ilan Kais Kebbal (born 10 July 1998) is an Algerian professional footballer who plays as a midfielder for French  club Paris FC on loan from Reims.

Career
Kebbal went through the reserve teams of Bordeaux and then Reims before joining Dunkerque on 2 July 2020. He made his professional debut with Dunkerque in a 1–0 Ligue 2 win over Toulouse FC on 22 August 2020.

Personal life
Born in France, Kebbal is of Algerian descent.

References

External links
 

1998 births
Living people
Footballers from Marseille
French footballers
French sportspeople of Algerian descent
Association football midfielders
Marignane Gignac Côte Bleue FC players
FC Girondins de Bordeaux players
Stade de Reims players
USL Dunkerque players
Paris FC players
Ligue 1 players
Ligue 2 players
Championnat National players
Championnat National 2 players
Championnat National 3 players